Daniel Yuste Escolar (17 November 1944 – 26 March 2020) was a Spanish cyclist. He competed in the individual pursuit at the 1968 Summer Olympics.

Escolar died at the age of 75 on 26 March 2020, due to complications of COVID-19 during the pandemic.

References

External links
 

1944 births
2020 deaths
Spanish male cyclists
Olympic cyclists of Spain
Cyclists at the 1968 Summer Olympics
Cyclists from the Community of Madrid
Deaths from the COVID-19 pandemic in Spain
People from Leganés